Qeshlaq-e Naveh (also Romanized as Qeshlāq-e Nāveh and Qeshlag-e Naveh; also known as Kalāteh-ye Shohadā-ye Nāveh, Kalāteh-ye Shahīd, and Shahīda Nāveh) is a village in Gifan Rural District, Garmkhan District, Bojnord County, North Khorasan Province, Iran. At the 2006 census, its population was 605, in 125 families.

References 

Populated places in Bojnord County